Victor Cui is a Canadian sports executive who is currently the president and CEO of the Edmonton Elks of the Canadian Football League.

Cui was previously the co-founder and CEO of ONE Championship (ONE), a mixed martial arts organization based in Singapore.

Early life 
Cui was born in Edmonton, Alberta, to Filipino parents and has Chinese ancestry on his father's side. At the age of five, Cui and his family left Edmonton for West Africa, and they returned to Edmonton when he was 13. Cui attended the University of Alberta, where he was a member of Phi Gamma Delta.

Career 
Before setting up ONE in 2011, Cui had nearly 15 years of experience in the sports media industry and was behind Martial Combat, a promotion which ran two shows per month at Resorts World Sentosa from May to October in 2010.

Cui has previously worked as a senior executive at ESPN Star Sports and the PGA Tour and has also been involved in X Games, Olympic Games, Commonwealth Games, and many other sporting events.

The first ONE show, ONE Fighting Championship: Champion vs. Champion, took place at the Singapore Indoor Stadium on 3 September 2011 and featured Phil Baroni, Yoshiyuki Yoshida, Gregor Gracie, and Eduard Folayang. 

According to Cui, everyone, including his wife, told him to use a smaller venue, but he was determined to prove them wrong. Since then the Singapore based promotion has held sold out events in Kuala Lumpur, Jakarta, Manila, and Singapore, secured a ten-year TV deal with ESPN Star Sports and signed various fighters.

ONE Elite Agency 
In November 2018, Cui launched a new global company called ONE Elite Agency. The agency manages martial arts athletes from ONE Championship, esports players, artists and musicians.

Edmonton Elks 
In January 2022, Cui was named the president and CEO of the Edmonton Elks, replacing Chris Presson who was fired after the 2021 season. Cui explained his decision to return to Edmonton to lead the team he grew up watching as "a dream come true". In the team's first home game under Cui's leadership, the Elks hosted "Stand With Ukraine" night in support of the Canada-Ukraine Foundation.

Awards and recognitions 
Cui has been described as "The most powerful man in Asian MMA" due to ONE's success and his relationships with other people in the industry. He was one of only five candidates to be nominated for 'Leading Man of the Year' the 2012 World MMA Awards and the only representative of an Asian promotion on this shortlist.

Cui's family is originally from Cebu, and he was a major awardee at the 31st SAC-SMC Cebu Sports Awards on March 17, 2013 for his work in turning ONE into the biggest MMA organization in Asia and showcasing Filipino fighters.

Personal life
Cui has a black belt in Taekwondo, as does his wife, and has been a fan of Mixed Martial Arts ever since watching UFC 1. He lives in Edmonton with his wife, two children and parents.

References

Living people
Canadian male taekwondo practitioners
Canadian sports executives and administrators
Canadian media executives
Mixed martial arts executives
Canadian people of Filipino descent
Canadian people of Chinese descent
Canadian expatriates in Singapore
Year of birth missing (living people)
Edmonton Elks personnel
ONE Championship